The black-throated sparrow (Amphispiza bilineata) is a small New World sparrow primarily found in the southwestern United States and Mexico. It is the only member of the genus Amphispiza; the five-striped sparrow, formerly also classified in Amphispiza, is now thought to be in the monotypic genus Amphispizopsis.

It is sometimes referred to as the desert sparrow, due to its preferred habitat of arid desert hillsides and scrub. This name usually refers to the desert sparrow of Africa and Asia.

Description 
Measurements:

 Length: 
 Weight: 
 Wingspan: 

The black-throated sparrow is pale gray above, with a distinctive black and white head pattern. Immature birds are similar but lack a black throat. Its call is high and bell-like, and its song is a fairly simple, mechanical tinkling. It feeds primarily on insects and seeds, and travels in small groups, though larger groups may accumulate around sources of water in the desert.

Three or four white or pale blue eggs are laid.

References 

David Allen Sibley, The Sibley Field Guide to Birds of Western North America.

External links 

Black-throated sparrow - Amphispiza bilineata - USGS Patuxent Bird Identification InfoCenter
Black-throated sparrow species account - Cornell Lab of Ornithology

Native birds of the Western United States
Birds of Mexico
black-throated sparrow
black-throated sparrow
American sparrows
Passerellidae